Helicoidea is a taxonomic superfamily of air-breathing land snails, terrestrial pulmonate gastropod mollusks in the clade Stylommatophora.

Taxonomy

2005 taxonomy
There are 19 families within the superfamily Helicoidea according to the taxonomy of the Gastropoda by Bouchet & Rocroi, 2005.
 Helicidae
 Bradybaenidae
 Camaenidae
 Cepolidae
 Cochlicellidae
 Elonidae
 Epiphragmophoridae
 Halolimnohelicidae
 Helicodontidae
 Helminthoglyptidae
 Humboldtianidae
 Hygromiidae
 Monadeniidae
 Pleurodontidae
 Polygyridae
 Sphincterochilidae
 Thysanophoridae
 Trissexodontidae
 Xanthonychidae

According to H. Nordsieck the family Xanthonychidae (sensu Hausdorf & Bouchet) is probably polyphyletic (contains several different lineages) and therefore should be divided into several families.

2012 taxonomy
Thompson & Naranjo-García (2012) described a new family Echinichidae and placed it to the superfamily Xanthonychoidea. Therefore, the family Xanthonychidae was moved from Helicoidea to Xanthonychoidea.

2015 taxonomy
Razkin et al. (2015) reorganized classification into monophyletic taxa according to the molecular phylogeny. This study is focus on Western Palaearctic species. The Hygromiidae s.l. family was divided into three families, Canariellidae, Geomitridae and Hygromiidae. Moreover, the family Cochlicellidae was including within the Geomitridae family as a tribe (Cochlicellini).

The classification proposed for Western Palaearctic Helicoidea is as follows:

 Bradybaeninae, subfamily of Camaenidae
 Camaenidae
Canariellidae
Elonidae
Geomitridae
Geomitrinae
Cochlicellini
Geomitrini
Plentuisini
Ponentinini
Helicellinae
Cernuellini
Helicellini
Trochoideini
Helicodontidae
Helicidae
Ariantinae
Helicinae
Allognathini
Helicini
Otalini
Thebini
Murellinae
Humboldtianidae
Hygromiidae
Ciliellinae
Hygromiinae
Leptaxinae
Sphincterochilidae
Trissexodontidae
Gittenbergeriinae
Trissexodontinae

References

 
Stylommatophora
Helicoidei
Taxa named by Constantine Samuel Rafinesque